Regan A. R. Gurung (born August 9, 1969) is an American psychologist and award-winning author.

Gurung has served as president of Psi Chi, the founding co-editor of the Scholarship of Teaching and Learning in Psychology published by the American Psychological Association, and co-chair of the APA's General Psychology Initiative. He has received numerous awards and honors for his contribution to social and pedagogical psychology, authoring more than a dozen educational books and publishing over 120 scientific articles in peer-reviewed journals.

History

Gurung was born in Bombay, India. He moved to the United States at an early age.

At the origin of his educational itinerary, Gurung attended and received his undergraduate degree in psychology in 1991 at the liberal arts-based Carleton College in Minnesota. He later earned his Master's and PhD in social and personality psychology from the University of Washington in Seattle during the mid-1990s. Since completing his doctoral studies, he assumed the role of Postdoctoral Research Fellow at the National Institute of Mental Health at UCLA in 1996. During the early 2000s, Gurung worked as an associate professor at the University of Wisconsin-Green Bay, ultimately becoming the chair at the university's Department of Psychology and later the associate dean of the Liberal Arts & Sciences.

As of 2019, he currently serves as a professor of psychology, associate vice provost and the executive director of the Center for Teaching and Learning and the psychology program at Oregon State University. He is also the founding co-editor of the APA's Scholarship of Teaching and Learning in Psychology journal.

Recognition
Since his tenure began amid teaching at numerous American universities, Gurung has authored and released more than 120 academic articles in peer-reviewed journals, authored 15 books, and amassed mass media attention. He has also been the subject of several honors and awards by the leading initiatives and organizational bodies in the social sciences. Gurung also appeared in a TEDx Talk.

Honors
 President of the International Honor Society Psi Chi (2018)
 American Psychological Association Teacher Spotlight (2017)
 Co-chairman of APA's General Psychology Initiative
 Wisconsin Professor of the Year (Council for the Advancement and Support of Education)
 Fellow of the American Psychological Association
 Fellow at the Association for Psychological Science

Awards
 SAGE Textbook Excellence Award (2022)
 Charles L. Brewer Award for Distinguished Career in Teaching Psychology (2017)
 Distinguished Achievement Award, Carleton College Alumni Association (2016)
 Regent's Teaching Award, University of Wisconsin (2011)
 UWGB Founder's Award for Excellence in Teaching

Books

References

External links
 
 
 Wisconsin Public Radio

Living people
21st-century American writers
American psychology writers
American social sciences writers
21st-century American psychologists
Gurung people
Social psychologists
1969 births
20th-century American psychologists